Lac-aux-Sables is a parish municipality in the Mékinac Regional County Municipality (MRC de Mékinac), in administrative district of the Mauricie region of the province of Quebec in Canada. Its population centres are Lac-aux-Sables and Hervey-Jonction.

Since its origins, the sector Hervey-Jonction with 300 inhabitants, is linked to the history of Lac-aux-Sables. Sector Hervey-Jonction is an area dotted with adventure vacation cottages, rivers, lakes and wild forests. On the religious aspect, the Catholic parish St. Leopold d'Hervey-Jonction serves the local population. On the civilian side, the sector is integrated into the municipality of Lac-aux-Sables.

Hervey-Jonction is the location of the Hervey-Jonction Station that is used today as a switching point for two passenger Via Rail trains (Abitibi and Saguenay). Hervey-Jonction railway station was built in 1905 and is now the junction of trains from Montreal to Quebec City, Saguenay-Lac-Saint-Jean, Haut-Saint-Maurice (upper Saint-Maurice region) and Abitibi.

Hervey-Jonction sector 

Since its origins, the sector of Hervey-Jonction which has a population of about 300 inhabitants, is linked to the history of Lac-aux-Sables. On the religious side, the service Saint-Leopold Hervey-Jonction serves the local population. On the civilian side, this area has been integrated into the parish municipality of Lac-aux-Sables since the beginning.

The second Hervey station was built in 1905 and is then the junction point for trains from Montréal to the city of Quebec, Saguenay-Lac-Saint-Jean, the Haut-Saint-Maurice and the Abitibi. Now, the train stops for a few minutes to separate and route the two passenger trains (the Abitibi] and the Saguenay-Lac-Saint-Jean.

North of the village, the area of Hervey Jonction is dotted with cottages, rivers, lakes and wild forests.

Geography
The municipality of the parish of Lac-aux-Sables is located about 95 kilometers northwest of the Quebec City, in the populated part of the Mékinac Regional County Municipality. The Batiscan River cut the municipal territory into two parts. The right bank of the Batiscan River has two major tributaries: the Propre River (meaning: "clean River" in English) and Tawachiche River.

The toponym "Lac aux Sables" comes from the lake of the same name. The lake has three tributaries, the most important is the outlet of "Brulé Lake". The two other are the outlets of Veillette Lake and "à la roche" (river to the rock). The mouth of the "Lac-aux-Sables" (Lake of sand) flows through the south into the Propre River whose path passes through Huron Lake (located to the west).

The territory of Lac-aux-Sables is mostly included in the Batiscanie, except the area of Missionary Lake at the western boundary, on the edge of Sainte-Thèecle which flows in the sub-basin of the Mekinac River, unless another area on the edge of Saint-Ubalde, Quebec (East) which flows into the Charest river.

In 2004, Lac-Masketsi (unorganized territory) was reduced in size by some  when portions were annexed by mostly Trois-Rives (70 km²) as well as Lac-aux-Sables (20 km²).

Demographics 

Population trend:

Mother tongue:
 English as first language: 0.8%
 French as first language: 95.8%
 English and French as first language: 0%
 Other as first language: 3.4%

History
The territory of Lac-aux-Sables began to be developed in 1871 with the construction of a road Notre-Dame-des-Anges to Lac-aux-Sables, in order to accommodate farmers from Canton Chavigny (Township). The area began to be settled in the 1880s. The parish of Saint-Rémi of Lac-aux-Sables was canonically erected as of 21 January 1897, and the Municipality of Lac-aux-Sables parish was erected civilly as of 24 April 1899. The territory of Saint-Rémi-du-Lac-aux-Sables was detached from Notre-Dame-des-Anges-de-Montauban, Saint-Casimir and Saint-Ubalde in 1899. The municipality was renamed Lac-aux-Sables in 1983.

In the 21st century, the resort and forestry sectors are the main economic drivers, with agriculture a secondary economic activity. The majority of workers work outside the municipality in forestry, rail, health, and social services.

Services located in Lac-aux-Sables include the post office beginning in 1892, telephone service in 1908, an electric power network since 1925, a waterworks since 1949, the collection of household waste since 1967, a fire protection service since 1967, a planning and municipal development since 1982, a water treatment plant since 1983, and a waste recovery service since 1987.

Municipal chronology

Religious chronology of Saint-Remi parish

Religious chronology of St. Leopold of Hervey-Jonction

School chronology

Attractions

Publishing on the history of Lac-aux-Sables

See also

References

External links 
 Municipalité de la paroisse du Lac-aux-Sables (Municipality of Lac-aux-Sables parish):  

Parish municipalities in Quebec
Incorporated places in Mauricie
Mékinac Regional County Municipality